Su-Chun Zhang (born 1963 in Wenzhou, Zhejiang), is an American stem cell researcher at Duke-NUS Medical School in Singapore and the University of Wisconsin–Madison.

Biography
Zhang obtained MD from the Wenzhou Medical College, Wenzhou, and PhD from the University of Saskatchewan, Canada.

Zhang was Professor of Anatomy and Neurology (now Neuroscience) and a research group leader at the University of Wisconsin–Madison.

In January 2005, Zhang's group differentiated human blastocyst stem cells into neural stem cells, then further into the starts of motor neurons, and eventually into spinal motor neuron cells (which play important role in delivering information from the brain to the spinal cord in the human body). The artificially generated motor neurons exhibited profiles the same as those normal natural ones, including functions like electrophysiological activity which is the signature of neurons. Zhang described this study,  "... you need to teach the blastocyst stem cells to change step by step, where each step has different conditions and a strict window of time". This research would have high significance for those human diseases or injuries related to spinal cord or motor neurons. Zhang's next step focused on the communicational ability of these newly generated neurons when they are transplanted into a living vertebrate.

See also
Stem cell treatments
Neural stem cells: development and transplantation: Chapter 10 - Neuronal Replacement by Transplantation (by Daniel J. Guillaume and Su-Chun Zhang)
Generating motor neurons

References

External links
Prof. Zhang @ Duke-NUS
Prof. Zhang @ Waisman Center, UW–Madison
Zhang Lab @ UW–Madison
Su-Chun Zhang, Affiliate, Neuroscience Training Program (NTP)
 Exploring the Promise of Embryonic Stem Cell Research

21st-century American biologists
Educators from Wenzhou
Stem cell researchers
University of Saskatchewan alumni
University of Wisconsin–Madison faculty
1963 births
Living people
Chinese medical researchers
Scientists from Wenzhou
Biologists from Zhejiang